Pasgoda Grama Niladhari Division is a Grama Niladhari Division of the Pasgoda Divisional Secretariat  of Matara District  of Southern Province, Sri Lanka .  It has Grama Niladhari Division Code 254.

Pasgoda is a surrounded by the Saputhanthirikanda, Thalapathkanda, Bengamuwa East, Bengamuwa South, Dampahala East, Napathella and Andaluwa  Grama Niladhari Divisions.

Demographics

Ethnicity 

The Pasgoda Grama Niladhari Division has a Sinhalese majority (99.1%) . In comparison, the Pasgoda Divisional Secretariat (which contains the Pasgoda Grama Niladhari Division) has a Sinhalese majority (97.1%)

Religion 

The Pasgoda Grama Niladhari Division has a Buddhist majority (99.5%) . In comparison, the Pasgoda Divisional Secretariat (which contains the Pasgoda Grama Niladhari Division) has a Buddhist majority (97.1%)

Grama Niladhari Divisions of Pasgoda Divisional Secretariat

References